The Dragoon Mountains are a range of mountains located in Cochise County, Arizona. The range is about 25 mi (40 km) long, running on an axis extending south-south east through Willcox. The name originates from the 3rd U.S. Cavalry Dragoons who battled the Chiricahua, including Cochise, during the Apache Wars. The Dragoons established posts around 1856 after the Gadsden Purchase made it a U.S. territory.

History 
Fossilized horn coral has been discovered on exposed limestone rock.

Ancient pictographs and matate dating to AD 1200 exist in the area and are attributed to the Mogollon people. The Apache people resided in this area beginning in the 15th century.

The warrior Cochise and his army defeated a small force of Confederate soldiers here at the First Battle of Dragoon Springs but was defeated at the Second Battle of Dragoon Springs a few days later. Cochise Stronghold Memorial Park lies near Mount Glenn on the eastern slope of the range and the historic town of Tombstone can be found at the southwestern portion of the range. There are also several ghost towns in the Dragoon Mountains including Gleeson and Courtland.

Geography 
The range is south of Interstate 10, between the Whetstone Mountains to the west, and Chiricahua Mountains to the east. Higher elevations of the major ranges in the region are in the Madrean Sky Islands ecoregion, with sky island habitats.

Mount Glenn (7,520 ft/2,292 m) is the highest point in the range.  The Little Dragoon Mountains are the continuation of the Dragoon Mountains north of Texas Canyon.

The mountains were included in the short-lived Dragoon National Forest, which was established in 1907 and combined into Coronado National Forest in 1908. The area is now included in the Douglas Ranger District.

Flora and fauna 
Evergreen oak woodlands and pines surround many areas of the range, as well as desert ferns, yucca, and cactus. Other notable species in the area include hexalectris colemanii, lupinus lemmonii, and penstemon discolor.

Climbing history
The earliest known roped, technical climbing in Cochise Stronghold took place in 1966, involving John Rupley and Fred Becky making a first ascent of a route on Vortex Dome.  In 1967 a set of climbers including Joanna McComb, Merle Wheeler, Don Morris and Dan Jones made several attempts to top out Rockfellow Dome, the highest of the summits in this tight group.  Although they did not succeed in reaching that particular summit they established high quality routes while maintaining a bold and clean climbing ethic. In 1972 Dave Baker (founder of Summit Hut in Tucson), Mark Axon and Mike McEwenbegan climbing in Cochise.  Eventually others including Gary Axen, Kem Johnson, Jake Bender, Scott Williams, Gary Hervert and Marti Woerner joined this group.  This group eventually completed ascents of  Rockfellow Dome, End Pinnacle and Cochise Dome.  They touched off what is known as the Golden Age of first ascents in Cochise.  Later notable climbers who were responsible for establishing routes in the area included Steve Grossman, John Steiger and Paul Davidson.  In 1979 this trio succeeded in climbing a route they named “As the Wind Cries” to the top of Chey Deas Tsay, the only dome remaining in Cochise Stronghold that had not yet been ascended.

Additional reading
 ToofastTopos 2, Cochise Stronghold Rock Climbing.  Author: Geir Hundal, (2018).

References

External links 

 Cochise Stronghold
 Visual overview

Mountain ranges of Cochise County, Arizona
Madrean Sky Islands mountain ranges
Coronado National Forest
Cochise County conflict
Mountain ranges of Arizona